Adam Miller may refer to:

Sports
Adam Miller (baseball) (born 1984), American professional baseball pitcher
Adam Miller (footballer, born 1982), English footballer
Adam Miller (footballer, born 1887) (1887–1972), Scottish footballer (Hamilton Academical)
Adam Miller (footballer, born 1883) (1883–1917), Scottish footballer
Adam Miller (sprinter) (born 1984), Australian sprinter
Adam Miller (ice hockey) (born 1984), American ice hockey player
Adam Miller (basketball) (born 2002), American college basketball player

Other
Adam Miller (pioneer) (1703–1783), first permanent settler of the Shenandoah Valley of Virginia, USA, 1727
Adam Lee Miller, American musician
Adam David Miller (1922–2020), African-American writer
Adam S. Miller, American professor of philosophy and religion writer
Adam Miller (politician), member of the Ohio House of Representatives
Adam Miller (painter) (born 1979), American painter